The second season of Matlock originally aired in the United States on NBC from September 22, 1987 – May 3, 1988 with a two hour season premiere (split into two parts when aired in syndication).

Cast

Main
 Andy Griffith as Ben Matlock
 Nancy Stafford as Michelle Thomas
 Kari Lizer as Cassie Phillips
 Kene Holliday as Tyler Hudson

Recurring
 Julie Sommars as ADA Julie March

Cast notes
Nancy Stafford and Kari Lizer joined the cast this season
Kari Lizer departed at the end of the season
Kari Lizer was absent for thirteen episodes
Kene Holliday was absent for four episodes
Nancy Stafford was absent for two episodes

Episodes

References

External links 
 

1987 American television seasons
1988 American television seasons
02